Crapaud is a French word meaning "toad".

Etymology
The word  ultimately is rooted from Frankish *krappō, *krappa, meaning "hook", likely in reference to the toad's hooked feet.

Heraldry
Crapaud is sometimes used as an incorrect reference to the Fleur-de-lys on the ancient heraldic flag of the kings of France. The three fleurs-de-lys were sometimes misinterpreted as "three toads erect, saltant", instead of "three lily flowers".

In fiction
The word crapaud is used extensively by fictional British soldier Richard Sharpe as a derogatory term for the French in Bernard Cornwell's novels set during the Napoleonic Wars.

Jean Crapaud
Jean Crapaud, also Johnny Crappeau or Johnny Crappo, as defined by Webster's Online Dictionary, "is a jocose name given to a Frenchman. It is intended as a national personification of the French people as a whole in much the same sense as John Bull is to the English. It is sometimes used as a literary device to refer to a typical Frenchman, usually in the form of Monsieur Jean Crapaud." The usage of the word "crapaud" in this case is similar to the derogative use of the word "frog", referencing the supposed French affinity for frog legs as a delicacy.

Jersey Crapaud 

The name Crapaud is used in the Channel Islands to describe a person from Jersey, the name meaning toad in the local Patois languages, including Jèrriais and Guernésiais. Toads live in Jersey but not on the other islands.

Gallery

References

Further reading
 James Edwards (Professor.). John Bull, Uncle Sam and Johnny Crapaud. Henry G. Little; 1888.
 James Edwards. John Bull, Uncle Sam and Johnny Crapaud. BiblioBazaar; February 2010. .
 Mary Alice Fontenot. Clovis Crawfish and the Curious Crapaud. Pelican Publishing; 1 November 1986. .

National personifications
Heraldic beasts